Ricardo Antonio Torres Tafur (born February 16, 1980) is a Colombian former professional boxer. He was managed by Billy Chams, owner of the Barranquilla-based firm Cuadrilátero. His brother, Jose Miguel Torres, is also a professional boxer.

During his childhood, Torres wanted to be a professional soccer player, but his father, who practiced boxing in the seventies, encouraged Ricardo to switch gears and concentrate on boxing.

Professional career 
Torres began boxing professionally in 2001 and had a torrid streak of 28 consecutive victories with 26 KO's before losing by KO in a vicious battle with Miguel Angel Cotto for the WBO Light Welterweight Title.  Torres had Cotto knocked down once during the fight.  After the loss to Cotto, he took on Mike Arnaoutis for the same WBO Light Welterweight Title vacated by Cotto and won the belt with a narrow split decision.

First Defense

Date: April 28, 2007.

Place: Barranquilla, Colombia, at Coliseo de la Universidad del Norte.

Opponent: Arturo Morua, from Mexico.

Outcome: Torres won by Unanimous Decision.

Second Defense

Date: September 1, 2007.

Place:  Barranquilla, Colombia, at Salón Jumbo del Country Club.

Opponent: Kendall Holt, from the United States of America.

Outcome: Torres won by technical knockout in the eleventh round, amid controversy.

Third Defense

Date: July 5, 2008

Place: Las Vegas, Nevada, USA, at Planet Hollywood Resort and Casino.

Opponent: Kendall Holt

Outcome: Torres was knocked out 61 seconds into the fight.  Before the knock out Torres had sent Kendall Holt to the canvas twice.

Professional record

|- style="margin:0.5em auto; font-size:95%;"
|align="center" colspan=8|33 Wins (29 knockouts), 2 Losses, 0 Draw
|- style="margin:0.5em auto; font-size:95%;"
|align=center style="border-style: none none solid solid; background: #e3e3e3"|Res.
|align=center style="border-style: none none solid solid; background: #e3e3e3"|Record
|align=center style="border-style: none none solid solid; background: #e3e3e3"|Opponent
|align=center style="border-style: none none solid solid; background: #e3e3e3"|Type
|align=center style="border-style: none none solid solid; background: #e3e3e3"|Rd., Time
|align=center style="border-style: none none solid solid; background: #e3e3e3"|Date
|align=center style="border-style: none none solid solid; background: #e3e3e3"|Location
|align=center style="border-style: none none solid solid; background: #e3e3e3"|Notes
|-align=center
|Win || 33-2 ||align=left| Raul Pinzon
| || 10 (10)
| || align=left|
|align=left|
|-align=center
|Loss || 32-2 ||align=left| Kendall Holt
| || 1 (12)
| || align=left|
|align=left|
|-align=center
|Win || 32-1 ||align=left| Kendall Holt
| || 11 (12)
| || align=left|
|align=left|
|-align=center
|Win || 31-1 ||align=left| Arturo Morua
| || 12
| || align=left|
|align=left|
|-align=center
|Win || 30-1 ||align=left| Mike Arnaoutis
| || 12
| || align=left|
|align=left|
|-align=center
|Win || 29-1 ||align=left| Carlos Donquiz
| || 2 (10)
| || align=left|
|align=left|
|-align=center
|Loss || 28-1 ||align=left| Miguel Cotto
| || 7 (12)
| || align=left|
|align=left|
|-align=center

See also 

List of light welterweight boxing champions
List of WBO world champions

External links 
 http://www.eastsideboxing.com/news.php?p=13552&more=1.  An interview with Ricardo Torres.
 

1980 births
Light-welterweight boxers
Living people
World Boxing Organization champions
Colombian male boxers
People from Bolívar Department
World light-welterweight boxing champions